HDMS Ditmarsken (or Ditmarschen) was a ship of the line of the Royal Dano-Norwegian Navy, launched in 1780.  She was lost to the British at the Battle of Copenhagen (1807).

Construction and design
Ditmarsken was constructed at Nyholm Dockyard to a design by Henrik Gerner. She was laid down on 17 December 1779, launched on 25 November 1780 and the construction was completed on 18 March 1783.

Her complement was 559 men and her armament was 64 guns.

Career
In 1798-1688m she was under the command of  Just Bille. She was lost to the British at the Battle of Copenhagen (1807).

References

1780 ships
Ships of the line of the Royal Dano-Norwegian Navy
Ships built in Copenhagen
Ships designed by Henrik Gerner
Captured ships
Napoleonic-era ships

da:Ditmarsken (1780)